Uppal is an Indian surname. The Khatris have a clan and the Jats have a tribe called Uppal. According to BN Puri, Uppal is derived from the Sanskrit term "utpalarana" which means "one who leaps upon their enemies".Puri further mentions it to be a part of the Bunjahi and Sareen subcaste of Khatris. However, as per R.C. Dogra, Uppal means "stone". Uppals have origins in the districts of Montgomery, Amritsar and Ludhiana.

Bibi Nanaki, the sister of Guru Nanak (founder of Sikhism) was married to Jai Ram, an Uppal Khatri. Hari Singh Nalwa, commander-in-chief of the Sikh Empire was born in Gujranwala in an Uppal Khatri family. Masand and cook of Guru Har Rai, Bhai Pheru was from an Uppal Khatri family. A city in modern-day Pakistan, Bhai Pheru (now known as Phool Nagar) is associated with him.Haqiqat Rai Puri, a martyr was married to the daughter of Kishan Uppal from a Batala based Khatri family, Sadda Singh Uppal from a Khatri family was an important soldier in Ranjit Singh's army. He led allegiance to the Krora Singh misl. Bhai Shihan, an Uppal Khatri was a prominent Sikh follower during Guru Arjan's life.

When Bhai Mardana was hungry during a travel with Guru Nanak, Nanak pointed to him a village of Uppal Khatris, and that if he visited the village all his desires will come true. Bhai Mardana was not only fed but was also given clothes and money as a token of hospitality. This village was highly praised.

Notable People 

 Chandeep Uppal, British actress
 Deana Uppal, winner of Miss India UK 2012
 Dharam Singh Uppal, Indian internation track and field athlete and Superintendent of Punjab Police
 Hari Uppal, Indian classical dancer
 Param Uppal, Australian actor
 Paul Uppal, UK politician
 Priscila Uppal, Canadian author, poet and playwright
 Sahil Uppal, Indian actor
 Shiraz Uppal, Pakistani singer
 Stephen Uppal, British-Indian actor
 Tim Uppal, Canadian politician, banker, and radio host
 Vikas Uppal, India's all time tallest man
 Vishal Uppal, Indian tennis player

See also 

 Uppal Khalsa, Jalandhar
 Uppal Jagir, Jalandhar

References

Surnames